{{Infobox government agency
| name                 = National Institute for Health and Disability Insurance
| native_name          = In Dutch: '' (RIZIV)In French: ' (INAMI)In German: Landesinstitut für Kranken- und Invalidenversicherung (LIKIV)
| native_name_a        = 
| native_name_r        = 
| type                 = Institute
| seal                 = 
| seal_width           = 
| seal_caption         = 
| logo                 = Logo_de_l'INAMI.png
| logo_width           = 100px
| logo_caption         = 
| image                = 
| image_size           = 
| image_caption        = 
| formed               = 
| preceding1           = 
| preceding2           = 
| dissolved            = 
| superseding1         = 
| superseding2         = 
| jurisdiction         = 
| headquarters         = Saint-Josse-ten-Noode, Brussels
| coordinates          = 
| motto                =
| employees            = 
| budget               = 37,175,106,000 EUR (2017)
| minister1_name       = Frank Vandenbroucke (politician)
| minister1_pfo        = Federal Minister of Social Affairs and Public Health
| minister2_name       = 
| minister2_pfo        = 
| deputyminister1_name = 
| deputyminister1_pfo  = 
| deputyminister2_name = 
| deputyminister2_pfo  = 
| chief1_name          = Benoît Collin
| chief1_position      = Administrator-General (01/07/2021)
| chief2_name          = Annick Sools
| chief2_position      = Adjoint administrator-general a.i.(anno 2021)
| public_protector     = 
| deputy               = 
| parent_department    = Federal Public Service Social Security
| parent_agency        = National Office for Social Security
| child1_agency        = 
| child2_agency        = 
| keydocument1         = 
| website              = 
| agency_id            =
| map                  = 
| map_size             = 
| map_caption          = 
| footnotes            = 
| embed                = 
}}
The National Institute for Health and Disability Insurance (NIHDI) is a federal public body of social security in Belgium. Under the authority of the Belgian federal minister of Social Affairs and Public Health, it is responsible for administering the country's compulsory national schemes for health insurance and disability benefits, and manages a compensation fund for medical accidents.

 Organisation 
The institute was founded by the law of August 9, 1963 establishing and organizing a scheme for compulsory insurance for medical treatment and benefits, which came into force on January 1, 1964. The law of 1963 has since been replaced by the law of July 14, 1994 regarding the compulsory insurance for medical treatment and benefits coordinated on July 14, 1994.

The institute's health and disability insurance budget for 2017 amounted to more than 37 billion euros.

 Activities 

 Health insurance: the NIHDI makes rules concerning the reimbursement of costs for health services and establishes standard prices. It manages and allocates the national budget for health reimbursements. The effective reimbursement of health service costs to patients is done by the different health insurance organisations that exist in Belgium (called mutualities). The NIHDI also inspects the correct application of reimbursement rules.
 Disability benefits: the NIHDI makes rules about the conditions required to receive benefits in case of labour incapacity caused by illness or injury, motherhood, fatherhood or adoption, establishes the amount of those benefits, and manages the financial support to incapacitated persons who want to start working again. It also combats disability fraud (a form of welfare fraud) by for example checking whether people receiving disability benefits are not working and secretly receiving a wage. Just as with health reimbursements, the effective payment of benefits to entitled people is done by the mutualities.
 Medical accidents:''' the NIHDI manages the Fund for Medical Accidents and examines whether victims of a medical accident have a right to compensation from the fund. The NIHDI also advises, mediates, registers and reports in cases of medical accidents.

See also 

 Belgian Health Care Knowledge Centre
 Healthcare in Belgium
 Federal Public Service Public Health, Food Chain Safety and Environment
 Sciensano

References 

Federal departments and agencies of Belgium
1964 establishments in Belgium
Social security in Belgium
Publicly funded health care
National health insurance schemes
Disability politics
Healthcare in Belgium